"The Fugitive" is episode 90 of the American television anthology series The Twilight Zone.

Opening narration

Plot 
At a public park, a group of children are playing softball with Old Ben, an elderly but playful gentleman. When it is Old Ben's turn at bat, he hits the ball over the fence and out of sight. When they play "Spaceman", Old Ben takes on the form of a shelled monster. The kids are accustomed to Old Ben's supernatural abilities, referring to them as his "magic".

Old Ben's favorite of the children is Jenny, who walks with a leg brace. Old Ben carries her to her home, where she lives with her shrewish and unsympathetic aunt, Agnes Gann. As they approach the row house, Ben causes his roller skates to dematerialize. This phenomenon is observed by two men who are watching the house from across the street. They enter the apartment building, identify themselves as police, and question Agnes about Ben. Jenny overhears the conversation and limps upstairs to Old Ben's apartment to warn him. Old Ben takes on the form of a mouse, fooling the men into thinking he has left his apartment.

Jenny takes the "mouse" back to her room. Old Ben tells Jenny that he is an alien from another planet, and that his appearance is only a disguise, as he is a fugitive from justice. Old Ben says he must flee to another planet, but before departing he uses a device to heal Jenny's leg. The two strangers run into Jenny walking down the stairs without her brace. They recognize Old Ben's handiwork, but Jenny refuses to tell them anything. One of the men uses a device to make Jenny deathly ill, using her as bait for Ben.

Old Ben comes back to Jenny's room and makes her well again. The two men approach and address Old Ben as "Your Majesty". Old Ben admits to Jenny he is not a criminal, but the king of his planet; Ben fled because he was fed up with most of his authority and control being overridden by "the Council". The strangers tell Jenny that Old Ben's people love him as much as she does; they want him to return and continue his 5,000-year reign. Jenny insists that if Old Ben cannot stay with her, she will go with him. The two men say this is forbidden, but allow Old Ben a moment alone with Jenny to say goodbye after he promises not to run away. Following a plan whispered to him by Jenny, Ben transforms into her exact duplicate, forcing the men to take both of them along since they cannot tell one from the other.

Rod Serling holds up a photograph of a handsome young man, noting that the photo shows Old Ben's true appearance and that when Jenny grows up, she will become his queen.

Closing narration

References 
 DeVoe, Bill. (2008). Trivia from The Twilight Zone. Albany, GA: Bear Manor Media. 
 Grams, Martin. (2008). The Twilight Zone: Unlocking the Door to a Television Classic. Churchville, Maryland: OTR Publishing.

External links 
 

1962 American television episodes
The Twilight Zone (1959 TV series season 3) episodes
Television shows written by Charles Beaumont
Fiction about shapeshifting